is a passenger railway station  located in the city of Sanda, Hyōgo Prefecture, Japan. It is operated by the private transportation company, Kobe Electric Railway (Shintetsu).

Lines

Station layout
The station consists of one deadheaded island platform serving two tracks. The effective length of the platform is five cars, but normally only three-car trains are operated. The station is unattended.

Platforms

History

In 2001, the station was selected as one of Best 100 Stations in Kinki Region by the Ministry of Land, Infrastructure, Transport and Tourism.

Passenger statistics
In fiscal 2019, the station was used by an average of 2,583 passengers daily

Surrounding area
The station is part of the Kobe-Sanda International Park City, with the surrounding area both commercial and residential. 
ÆON Woody Town
Century Plaza-mae Bus stop (for Kobe Airport, Sannomiya and others)
Hyogo Prefectural Route 720 Techno Park Sanda Route

See also
List of railway stations in Japan

References

External links 

 Official home page 

Railway stations in Hyōgo Prefecture
Railway stations in Japan opened in 1996
Sanda, Hyōgo